Bolshoy Kuganak (Olo Quğanaq) is a rural locality (a selo) and the administrative centre of Kuganaksky Selsoviet, Sterlitamaksky District, Bashkortostan, Russia. The population was 2,368 as of 2010. There are 24 streets.

Geography 
Bolshoy Kuganak is located 27 km northeast of Sterlitamak (the district's administrative centre) by road. Khripunovsky is the nearest rural locality.

References 

Rural localities in Sterlitamaksky District